Toldi may refer to:

Toldi (tank), Hungarian light tank 
Toldi trilogy, epic poem trilogy written by the Hungarian poet János Arany
Miklós Toldi (1320–1390), Hungarian nobleman